Roy Ratnavel is a Sri Lankan Tamil Canadian business executive and the author of the book Prisoner #1056.

He is the Head of Distribution and Executive Vice-President at the CI Financial.

Early life

Ratnavel was born in 1969 in Colombo, Sri Lanka and brought up in Point Pedro, a small town in the northern part of Jaffna Peninsula during the Sri Lankan Civil War.

He was arrested during Operation Liberation just for being a Tamil on suspicion and became a political prisoner at the age of 17 and underwent severe hardships at the prison in brutal and oppressive ways. After his miraculous release from prison, he reached Canada at the age of 18 with just $50 in his pocket.

Two days after arriving, his father was shot and killed. He had to start life in the new country in a highly traumatised condition, alone.

Education
Ratnavel completed his high school while working. He earned his bachelor's degree from the University of Toronto.

Career

Ratnavel started his career with an entry-level job in CI Financial’s mailroom and subsequently rose to a senior leadership position as an executive vice president.

Awards and recognition

Best Executive Awards by The Globe and Mail

Ratnavel is one of the award recipients among 50 Canadian Best Executives in 2020; they led their companies through COVID-19 and built a better country in the process. The recipients were vetted by The Globe and Mail editors.

Bibliography

Ratnavel’s Prisoner #1056 narrates his immigrant story, fleeing from torture and imprisonment, arriving in Canada with $50 in his pocket, and then rising from the mailroom to the executive suite.

Brian Mulroney, former Prime Minister of Canada noted on Prisoner #1056;

“Millions of people fleeing countries less fortunate have found here in Canada a refuge from mistrust and hatred and violence which has allowed them to achieve their potential in the rich soil of our freedom. Roy’s life is one such story. While Roy’s remarkable personal journey is unique to him, reading his book one cannot help but hear a familiar refrain that will resonate with millions of Canadians, because at its core it is the story of the immigrant experience. And in the final analysis, we are all children of immigrants.”

References 

1969 births
Canadian people of Sri Lankan Tamil descent
University of Toronto alumni
Living people
Sri Lankan emigrants to Canada
Year of birth missing (living people)